Bà Rịa–Vũng Tàu Daily News is a news agency in Bà Rịa–Vũng Tàu province, Vietnam. As an official newspaper in Bà Rịa–Vũng Tàu, the newspaper gives easy access to various topics, such as economy, culture, and life in the province.

Timeline
 April 1980: Vũng Tàu–Côn Đảo Newspaper (currently Bà Rịa–Vũng Tàu Newspaper) was launched after the foundation of Vũng Tàu–Côn Đảo special zone (currently Bà Rịa–Vũng Tàu province)
 September 10, 1980: The first issue was published with four pages.
 2004: Bà Rịa–Vũng Tàu Newspaper is issued daily with 12 pages and launched its online version at http://www.baobariavungtau.com.vn.

References

External links
Bà Rịa–Vũng Tàu Daily Newspaper website

Newspapers published in Vietnam
Vietnamese-language newspapers